Zlatko Ivanković (born 22 November 1952) is a Croatian football coach. He is the brother of former national team coach Branko Ivanković.

Career
He managed Iranian club Bargh Shiraz, but was replaced by Bijan Zolfagharnasab at the end of the 2005–2006 season.

Career

 NK Slaven Belupo Youth (2002–2005)
 Bargh Shiraz F.C. (2005–2006)
 NK Sloboda Varaždin
 Persepolis F.C.
 Al-Ahli Saudi FC
 Oman national football team

References

1957 births
Living people
Yugoslav football managers
Croatian football managers
Bargh Shiraz F.C. managers
Croatian expatriate football managers
Expatriate football managers in Iran
Croatian expatriate sportspeople in Iran
Persepolis F.C. non-playing staff
Al Ahli Saudi FC non-playing staff
Croatian expatriate sportspeople in Saudi Arabia
Croatian expatriate sportspeople in Oman